Wadgaon Savtal is a village in Parner taluka in Ahmednagar district of state of Maharashtra, India.

Religion
The majority of the population in the village is Hindu.

Economy
The majority of the population has farming as their primary occupation.

See also
 Parnertaluka
 Villages in Parner taluka

References 
Vikas bhangade 

Villages in Parner taluka
Villages in Ahmednagar district